Ditmars may refer to:

People
 Abram D. Ditmars, two-time mayor of Long Island City in Queens, New York, US
 Ivan Ditmars, music writer for Let's Make a Deal from 1963 to 1976
 Raymond Ditmars (1876–1942), American herpetologist and filmmaker

Places
 Ditmars, Queens, a neighborhood in Queens, New York, US
 Ditmars Boulevard–Astoria (BMT Astoria Line), a rapid transit station in New York City
 Ditmars Boulevard (formerly Ditmars Avenue), a street in New York City

See also
 Dietmar, a given name
 Ditmar (disambiguation)
 Dittmar, a surname

Surnames from given names